Tinkers Creek or Tinker's Creek may refer to:

Bridge

Tinkers Creek Aqueduct bridging the Ohio and Erie Canal over Tinkers Creek in Ohio

Stream

Idaho
Big Tinker Creek in Idaho County
Little Tinker Creek in Idaho County

Kentucky
Left Fork Tinker Fork in Floyd County
Right Fork Tinker Fork in Floyd County
Tinker Fork in Floyd County
Tinker Run in Hardin County

Maine
Tinker Brook in Hancock County

Maryland
Tinkers Creek in Prince George's County

Massachusetts
Tinkerville Brook in Worcester County

New Hampshire
Tinker Brook in Coos County

New Jersey
Tinkers Branch in Camden County

North Carolina
Tinkers Creek in Davidson County

Ohio
Tinker Creek in Trumbull County
Tinkers Creek (Cuyahoga River) in Cuyahoga, Summit, and Portage counties

Oklahoma
Tinker Creek in Oklahoma County

Oregon
Tinker Creek in Grant County

Pennsylvania
Tinker Creek in Susquehanna County
Tinker Run in Clearfield County
Tinkers Run in Westmoreland County
Tinkertown Run in McKean County

Rhode Island
Tinkerville Brook in Providence County

South Carolina
Tinker Creek in Aiken County
Tinker Creek in Union County
Tinkers Creek in Chester County

Tennessee
Tinker Branch in Cocke County
Tinker Branch in Polk County

Vermont
Tinker Brook in Windsor County

Virginia
Tinker Creek in Roanoke County

See also
Tinker (disambiguation)